The 2014 European Archery Championships is  the 23rd edition of the European Archery Championships. The event was held in Echmiadzin, Armenia from July 21 to July 26, 2014.

Championships also served as qualification event for 2015 European Games.

Medal summary

Recurve

Compound

Medal table

Participating nations
At the close of registrations, 39 nations had registered 274 athletes, fewer than the 2012 European Championships which had doubled as qualification for the 2012 Olympic competition.

  (8)
  (8)
  (6)
  (7)
  (7)
  (4)
  (6)
  (1)
  (6)
  (12)
  (6)
  (8)
  (12)
  (6)
  (12)
  (12)
  (3)
  (1)
  (2)
  (4)
  (12)
  (8)
  (1)
  (7)
  (3)
  (4)
  (12)
  (6)
  (12)
  (2)
  (4)
  (12)
  (9)
  (7)
  (9)
  (7)
  (10)
  (12)
  (6)

References

External links
Official results
Results book

European Archery Championships
2014 in archery
2014 in Armenian sport
International sports competitions hosted by Armenia
Archery competitions in Armenia
2014 in European sport